Taichung station is a railway station in Taichung, Taiwan served by Taiwan Railways Administration. It is served by all TRA services along the route.

History

The station was originally constructed in 1905 in a wooden building architectural style and started its operation in 1908. In 1917, it was rebuilt as a red brick structure with Renaissance architectural style.

On 16 October 2016, the elevated station was inaugurated in which the ground-level station was shut down. The first train that arrived at the elevated station was at 06:28. The ceremony was attended by President Tsai Ing-wen and Transportation and Communication Minister Hochen Tan.

Overview
The old station has one side platform and one island platform. The architecture dates from the era of Japanese rule, and is classified as a National Tier 2 Historic Site. The now-defunct Taiwan Sugar Railways' Zhong-Zhuo line once stopped at the station.

The new station layout has one side platform and two island platforms, but currently only one side platform and one island platform are used. They have the same numbering as the old station only reversed.

Platform layout
Jianguo Road

Fuxing Road

Around the station
 Chang Hwa Bank Headquarters and Museum
 National Chung Hsing University
 National Library of Public Information
 Taichung Confucian Temple
 Taichung Park
 Yizhong Street
 Central Bookstore
 Taichung Prefectural Hall
Central District Office

Chungyo Department Store

References

External links

Taichung Station (Chinese)
Taichung Station (English)

1905 establishments in Taiwan
Railway stations served by Taiwan Railways Administration
Railway stations in Taichung
Railway stations opened in 1905
Rebuilt buildings and structures in Taiwan